George McHenry Seeman, Jr. (April 3, 1916 – August 31, 1998) was an American football player in the National Football League. He was drafted by the Green Bay Packers in the eighth round of the 1940 NFL Draft and was a member of the team that season.

References

Sportspeople from Lincoln, Nebraska
Green Bay Packers players
Nebraska Cornhuskers football players
1916 births
1998 deaths
Omaha Central High School alumni